Acinetobacter nectaris is a gram-negative, oxidase-negative, catalase-positive, strictly aerobic nonmotile bacterium from the genus Acinetobacter isolated from floral nectar pollinated by Mediterranean insects in the Doñana National Park in the Huelva Province in Spain. Bacterial communities, including microbes identified as A. nectaris are closely associated with plant communities; other strains of bacteria (Gluconoacetobacter, Erwinia and Rhizobium) have been found in environments that mother bees visit. This bacterium was first characterized in 2013.

References

External links
Type strain of Acinetobacter nectaris at BacDive -  the Bacterial Diversity Metadatabase

Moraxellaceae
Bacteria described in 2013